This is a list of airports on Vancouver Island, British Columbia, Canada:

Greater Victoria

Vancouver Island beyond Greater Victoria

Land airports

Scheduled commercial airline service

Other

Water aerodromes

Scheduled commercial airline service

Other

Heliports

See also

 List of airports in the Gulf Islands
 List of airports in the Lower Mainland
 List of airports in the Okanagan
 List of airports in the Prince Rupert area
 List of airports in Greater Victoria

References

Vancouver Island
Vancouver Island
Vancouver Island
Alberni-Clayoquot Regional District
Campbell River, British Columbia
Comox Valley Regional District
Courtenay, British Columbia
Cowichan Valley
Cowichan Valley Regional District
Duncan, British Columbia
Regional District of Mount Waddington
Regional District of Nanaimo
Port Alberni
Strathcona Regional District
Lists of buildings and structures in British Columbia